The 1890 County Championship was the first County Championship held as an official competition, following agreement between Marylebone Cricket Club (MCC) and the leading county clubs at a meeting in December 1889. Surrey became the first official county champions after winning nine out of fourteen games.

Constitution of the official championship
The official County Championship was constituted in a meeting at Lord's on 10 December 1889 which was called to enable club secretaries to determine the 1890 fixtures. While this was going on, representatives of the eight leading county clubs held a private meeting to discuss the method by which the County Championship should in future be decided. A majority were in favour of "ignoring drawn games altogether and settling the championship by wins and losses." Under this system defeats were subtracted from victories and the county with the highest total were champions. The new competition, which had official sanction, began in the 1890 season and initially featured Gloucestershire, Kent, Lancashire, Middlesex, Nottinghamshire, Surrey, Sussex and Yorkshire.

1890 County Championship
The 1890 County Championship was the first officially organised edition. It ran from 12 May to 28 August. Surrey, who had been unofficially proclaimed "Champion County" by sections of the press after the previous season, became the first official champions by winning nine of their fourteen matches.

Fixtures

May

Final table
One point was awarded for a win, and one point was taken away for each loss, therefore:
 1 for a win
 0 for a draw
 -1 for a loss

Statistical summary

References

Bibliography

External links
 Cricket in England in 1890
 1890 County Championship at CricketArchive

1890 in English cricket
County Championship seasons
English cricket seasons in the 19th century